Adriano Bernardes Rodrigues da Silva (born 14 January 1986), known as Adriano Rodríguez or Adriano Bernardes, is a Brazilian professional footballer. He was signed by FC Chiasso in February 2008.

Bernardo started his career at Juventud de Las Piedras and won 2006 Torneo di Viareggio as A.Rodríguez. He is nicknamed Fabuloso. In December 2007 he trailed at Pescara.

References

External links
 Challenge League Statistics 

1986 births
Living people
Brazilian footballers
Brazilian expatriate footballers
Expatriate footballers in Italy
Expatriate footballers in Switzerland
Association football forwards
FC Chiasso players